The Nebraska Cornhuskers men's basketball team represents the University of Nebraska–Lincoln in the Big Ten Conference of NCAA Division I. The program's first year of competition was 1897, and since then NU has compiled an all-time record of 1,535–1,417, with seven NCAA Tournament and sixteen NIT appearances. The team has been coached by Fred Hoiberg since 2019.

Nebraska has the distinction of being the only major conference program to have never won a game in the NCAA Tournament, and did not make the tournament until 1986. Much of the team's modest success came during the fourteen-year tenure of Danny Nee, Nebraska's all-time winningest head coach. Nee led the Cornhuskers to five of their seven NCAA Tournament appearances and six NIT bids, including the 1996 NIT championship, NU's only national postseason title. After Nee was fired in 2000, Barry Collier was hired and led the program for six years until leaving to become athletic director at Butler University. Doc Sadler led the Cornhuskers through the school's transition from the Big 12 to the Big Ten, but like Collier, Sadler failed to make an NCAA Tournament appearance. Tim Miles returned Nebraska to the tournament in his second season, but did not make it back and was fired in 2019, when Nebraska hired former Chicago Bulls head coach Fred Hoiberg.

Coaching history

References

Nebraska Cornhuskers basketball head coaches

Nebraska